Dionysius was an Irish priest in the first third of the twelfth century: the first recorded Archdeacon of Aghadoe.

References

Archdeacons of Aghadoe